Kinematic coupling describes fixtures designed to exactly constrain the part in question, providing precision and certainty of location. A canonical example of a kinematic coupling consists of three radial v-grooves in one part that mate with three hemispheres in another part. Each hemisphere has two contact points for a total of six contact points, enough to constrain all six of the part's degrees of freedom. An alternative design consists of three hemispheres on one part that fit respectively into a tetrahedral dent, a v-groove, and a flat.

Background 
Kinematic couplings arose from the need of precision coupling between structural interfaces that were meant to be routinely taken apart and put back together.

Kelvin Coupling 

The Kelvin coupling is named after William Thompson (Lord Kelvin) who published the design in 1868–71. It consists of three spherical surfaces that rest on a concave tetrahedron, a V-groove pointing towards the tetrahedron and a flat plate. The tetrahedron provides three contact points, while the V-groove provides two and the flat provides one for a total required six contact points. The benefit of this design is that the center of rotation is located at the tetrahedron, however, it suffers from contact stress problems in high-load applications.

Maxwell coupling 

The principles of this coupling system were originally published by James Clerk Maxwell in 1871. The Maxwell Kinematic system consists of three V-shaped grooves that are oriented to the center of the part, while the mating part has three curved surfaces that sit down into the three grooves. Each of the three v-grooves provides two contact points for a total of six. This design benefits from symmetry and therefore easier manufacturing techniques. Also, the Maxwell coupling is thermally stable due to this symmetry as the curved surfaces can expand or contract in unison in the v-grooves.

Theory 

The reproducibility and the precision of a kinematic coupling come from the idea of exact constraint design. The principle of exact constraint design is that the number of points of constraint should be equal to the number of degrees of freedom to be constrained. In a mechanical system there are six potential degrees of freedom. There are three linear degrees of freedom (also known as translation) along the "x", "y", and "z" axis, and three rotational degrees of freedom around each axis commonly called roll, pitch and yaw. If a system is under-constrained then the two parts are free to move in one of the degrees of freedom. if the system is over-constrained it can cause the system to break down under deformation, extra care needs to be taken when designing an over-constrained system. Kinematic coupling designs only make contact with the number of points equal to the number of degrees of freedom that are to be restrained and therefore are predictable.

See also 
Kinematics
Kinematic determinacy
Precision engineering

References

External links
 http://pergatory.mit.edu/kinematiccouplings/
 http://kinematiccouplings.org/
 http://precisionballs.com/Kinematic_cook_book.php

Linkages (mechanical)